Ion Oblemenco (13 May 1945 – 1 September 1996) was a Romanian football striker who spent the majority of his career playing for Universitatea Craiova. He is known for being four times the top-goalscorer of the Romanian top-division, Divizia A, having a total of 170 goals scored in his 272 appearances in the competition, however these performances were not enough to earn him a cap for the national team.

Playing career

Ion Oblemenco, nicknamed "Tunarul" (The Gunner) because of his goal scoring ability was born in Corabia, Olt County and began his youth career in 1958 at the age of 13 at local club Progresul, his first coach being Petre Prodileanu. From 1959 he moved at CFR Electroputere Craiova who merged with Știința Craiova to form CSO Craiova where he ended his youth period. He played his first senior match on 6 May 1962 under coach Valeriu Călinoiu, playing for CSO Craiova in a Divizia B match which ended 0–0 against CSM Mediaș. In the 1962–63 season he played for Tractorul Corabia, being the team's top-goalscorer, helping it gain promotion to Divizia C. At age 19, he was brought by coach Valentin Stănescu to Rapid București who gave him his senior debut in a Divizia A match which took place on 5 July 1964 and ended with a in a 3–1 defeat in which he scored his team's goal against Știința Cluj. At Rapid, Oblemenco's first team opportunities were limited as he was kept out of the side by forwards Emil Dumitriu and Ion Ionescu, leaving Rapid in the summer of 1966 in order to return to Universitatea Craiova at the advice of his friend, a "U" Craiova player, Silviu Stănescu. Oblemenco made his re-debut for "U" Craiova, this time in Divizia A under coach Robert Cosmoc in a 4–1 loss in front of Dinamo București, by the end of the season he scored a total of 17 goals which were enough for him to win his first top-goalscorer of Divizia A title, also he scored from a penalty kick the only goal of the victory against his former team, Rapid who would eventually win the title that season. In the last game of the 1969–70 season, The Blue Lions were playing against Argeș Pitești on their ground and Oblemenco and Argeș's star, Nicolae Dobrin were competing for the top-goalscorer of the season title, Oblemenco leading with one goal above Dobrin, the latter opened the score in the 37th minute but The Gunner equalized one minute later and the game ended 1–1, thus Oblemenco earning his second league top-goalscorer title with 19 goals. He won two more consecutive top-goalscorer titles in the 1971–72 and 1972–73 seasons with 20 goals scored in the first and a personal record of 21 in the second. In the first round of the 1973–74 UEFA Cup season "U" Craiova eliminated Fiorentina, Oblemenco scoring the only goal of the double in the last minute of the second leg, Italian journalist, Gianfranco Pancani writing after the game:"Oblemenco is a real demon. He shoots like a cannon from any position". In the 1973–74 Divizia A, season, he was used by coach Constantin Cernăianu in 29 games in which he scored 14 goals which helped The Blue Lions win the first trophy in the club's history, being the team's second top-goalscorer with 5 goals behind Iulian Bălan. In the following season, he played his first games in the European Cup, scoring two goals in the first round against the champion of Sweden, Åtvidaberg, however it was not enough to qualify to the next round as the double was lost with 4–3 on aggregate. Oblemenco played his last Divizia A match on 12 December 1976 in a 1–0 away loss in front of Jiul Petroșani, having a total of 272 matches with 170 goals scored in the competition, but that was not his last appearance for Universitatea Craiova as he made a appearance in a 3–0 victory, also against Jiul in the successful 1976–77 Cupa României campaign, where he did not play at all in the later stages as he had a conflict with coach Constantin Teașcă. In the 1977–78 Divizia B season, Oblemeco made his last appearances as a footballer, playing 33 matches at FCM Galați being the top-goalscorer of the league with 23 goals, also during his whole career he played 9 games in which he scored four goals in European competitions (including 7 appearances in the Inter-Cities Fairs Cup). Even do he played for Romania's Olympic team and Romania B, Ion Oblemenco never played for Romania's senior team and on 13 May 2020, Gazeta Sporturilor included him in a first 11 of best Romanian players who never played for the senior national team.

Managerial career

In the 1978–79 Divizia A season, Ion Oblemenco returned at Universitatea Craiova to work as a vice-president but in the middle of the season he was appointed as a assistant of his former Rapid coach Valentin Stănescu, together they managed to win the league title in the following season which was the second title in the history of the club. In the following season, Stănescu left the club to go coach Dinamo București so Oblemenco was named head coach and managed to win for the first time in the club's history, The Double, the Cupa României being won after a 6–0 victory in the final against Politehnica Timișoara. In the following season, he lead the team for the first time in the history of Romanian football to the quarter-finals of the European Cup after eliminating Olympiacos and Kjøbenhavns Boldklub, being eliminated with 3–1 on aggregate by Bayern Munich. He was dismissed after the team finished the 1981–82 season on the second place. In the autumn of 1982, Oblemenco was appointed as head coach of Chimia Râmnicu Vâlcea, a position he held until the 27th round of the 1984–85 season. In July 1985 he worked at Olt Scornicești only until September of that year, going afterwards to work at Sportul Muncitoresc Slatina in the middle of the 1985–86 Divizia B season, leaving the team in October 1986. In May 1987 Pandurii Târgu Jiu who at that time was occupying the last place of the 1986–87 Divizia B appointed Oblemenco as head coach, managing to help it win 5 consecutive matches, thus avoiding relegation. He then had two second spells at Sportul Muncitoresc Slatina, respectively Olt Scornicești, at the latter working as a assistant. He coached for the first and only time the team from his native Corabia, Progresul in the second half of the 1988–89 Divizia C season, leaving after failing to earn promotion to Divizia B. In the 9th round of the 1990–91 Divizia B season, Oblemenco took over Chimia Râmnicu Vâlcea who was occupying the 8th place and took it by the end of the season to the second place which was not enough to gain promotion to Divizia A as Electroputere Craiova won the first place. From 1991 until 1992, Oblemenco worked at Universitatea Craiova as a sports director, head coach, technical director and for a short while as head coach of the team's satellite team, Constructorul-Universitatea Craiova. At the end of the 1994–95 Divizia C season, he was appointed as coach at ARO Muscelul Câmpulung alongside technical director Nicolae Dobrin, helping the team earn promotion to the second league after winning a promotion play-off. In January 1996 he was appointed as sports director at Electroputere Craiova and in the middle of the same year he went to coach in Morocco at Hassania Agadir where on 1 September 1996 he died after suffering a heart attack during a game with Union Sidi Kacem. Ion Oblemenco has a total of 183 matches as a manager in the Romanian top-division, Divizia A consisting of 83 victories, 33 draws and 67 losses.

Personal life
Ion Oblemenco's father was a Ukrainian named Andrei, while his mother, Margareta was from Oltenia, Ion being the couple's first child as the couple had two more daughters. In 1969 he married Margareta Lepădatu, who was a volleyball player at Universitatea Craiova and in 1972 she gave birth to the couple's only child, a daughter named Clara who married footballer Adrian Pigulea. During his life, Oblemenco had some serious health problems as in October 1972 he was diagnosed with peptic ulcer, a disease for which he was operated twice and was absent from the field until March 1973 when The Gunner scored a hat-trick in a 6–4 away victory against Rapid in his first game after the operation, also in February 1996 he had a car accident in which he fractured one of his legs. While he was in his last spell of his coaching career in Morocco, on 1 September 1996 during a match between the team he was managing, Hassania Agadir, and fellow Romanian Alexandru Moldovan's team, Union Sidi Kacem Oblemenco suffered a heart attack after getting mad that in the final minutes of the game, while the score was 1–1, his team scored a goal but the referee cancelled it, Moldovan was the first to alert the medical teams of his situation who came and gave him first aid, also taking him to the hospital where he died that day at age 51. He was named posthumously Honorary Citizen of his native Corabia and Craiova, having statues in both of these towns, the one from Craiova being displayed in front of the Ion Oblemenco stadium which is named in his honor same as the one from Corabia, also Hassania Agadir named their conference room after him. Two books about him were written, the first was called Ion Oblemenco și campioana unei mari iubiri (Ion Oblemenco and the champion of a great love) and appeared in 1975 with the author being Marius Popescu and the second volume was called Oblemenco, meciul cu viața (Oblemenco, the match with life) and appeared in 2009, being written by Ion Jianu.

Honours

Player
Universitatea Craiova
Divizia A: 1973–74
Cupa României: 1976–77

Manager
Universitatea Craiova
Divizia A: 1980–81
Cupa României: 1980–81

Individual
Divizia A top-goalscorer: 1967, 1970, 1972, 1973
Divizia B top-goalscorer: 1978

References

External links

1945 births
1996 deaths
People from Corabia
Romanian footballers
Association football forwards
Liga I players
Liga II players
FC Rapid București players
CS Universitatea Craiova players
FCM Dunărea Galați players
Romanian football managers
CS Universitatea Craiova managers
CS Pandurii Târgu Jiu managers
FC U Craiova 1948 managers
Hassania Agadir managers
Romanian expatriate sportspeople in Morocco
Expatriate football managers in Morocco